The Zurich derby is a football match between rivals FC Zürich and Grasshopper Club Zürich. The two teams were founded in Zürich, Switzerland. Grasshopper in 1886 and FC Zürich in 1896. Grasshoppers are historically known as the club of the elite, students and Zürcher upper-class and FCZ are known as the club of the working-class. The derby is unique in Switzerland as it is the only rivalry between two teams from the same city.

History
The first derby between the two Zurich clubs was held as part of the first Swiss championship, where GC defeated FC Zurich 7–2.

Records
Grasshopper's highest win to date was an 11–2 victory over on 6 December 1942. FC Zurich's highest win was more recent, a 6–0 victory on 7 August 2011.

To date, FC Zurich only once managed to win all matchups in one season, 2014–15: 1–0, 3–1, 2–0, and 4–3 in the league and a 1–0 (a.e.t.) victory in the Swiss Cup. Grasshoppers have won all four matchups in season 1997–98: 2–1, 3–1, 2–0, and 2–1.

Notable matches
March 3, 2004 One of the most notable matches was the semifinal of the 2003–04 Swiss Cup. An early goal by Daniel Gygax and a disgraceful own goal by Reto Ziegler saw FCZ leading 0–2 after only eleven minutes. Mladen Petric managed to bring GC on the board in the 37th minute (2–1), but Gygax brought the half-time score to 1–3 in favor of FC Zurich.

After the break, Eduardo let GC hopes flair up again in the 57th minute (2–3). These hopes were quickly dashed by Daniel Gygax, who scored his 3rd goal of the match (2–4), and Cesar within two minutes shortly after. Cesar would receive his second yellow of the game due to excessive celebration and was sent off, but with a score of 2–5 in favor of FCZ, the match seemed over nonetheless. However, GC managed to rally, especially around Eduardo, who brought them back to a one-goal difference with two goals, his 2nd and 3rd of the match, in the 83rd (3–5) and 89th minute (4–5), respectively. GC's pressure did not let off and in the 90th minute Petric managed to score a rebound off FCZ goalkeeper Taini to equalize the game (5–5).

Five minutes into extra time, Richard Nuñez managed to bring GC in the lead for the first time of the match with an exceptional lob over goalie Taini. In the 106th minute, referee Urs Meier failed to call an obvious penalty for FCZ and in the following GC managed to win the game with a final score of 6–5 after extra time. GC advanced to the Cup Final, where they lost 2–3 to FC Wil.

7 August 2011 This match of the 2011–12 Swiss Super League went down as FC Zurich's highest derby victory to date. FC Zurich were clearly the better team and quickly took the upper hand. FCZ captain Silvan Aegerter opened the score in the 15th minute. Despite dominating and a long-distance shot by Dusan Djuric that hit the post, the first half ended with a 1–0 lead for FCZ.

Four minutes into the second half, Alexandre Alphonse expanded FCZ's lead to 2-0 and few minutes later (54th minute) Raphael Koch shot the 3–0. GC, unable to mount any sort of reaction, conceded three more times: Admir Mehmedi (67), Stjepan Kukuruzović (77), and Adrian Nikci (87) shot the fourth, fifth, and sixth goal for FCZ, respectively. Six different players shot FCZ's six goals of the match. GC's Bruno Bertucci was sent off in the 86th minute after his second yellow card.

29 November 2015 Grasshopper's highest derby victory of the 21st century was in this match and is a near opposite of the one four years prior. In the 15th minute, Munas Dabbur is able to take advantage of a colossal error by FCZ defender Berat Djimsiti and brings GC in the lead. Despite many chances for FCZ and a shot on the bar by GC's Shani Tarashaj, the first half ended 1–0.

After a slow start to the second half, Djimsiti fails to block GC captain Kim Källstrom's long pass into the box, where Yoric Ravet easily puts it past the goalkeeper (57th minute). Tarashaj scored seven minutes later (64), after a masterful double pass with Ravet, to make the score 3–0. Another seven minutes later (71), Caio leaves two FCZ defenders behind him and slides the ball past goalie Anthony Favre. In the 91st minute, Källstrom caps off the game with the 5–0.

Fan Misbehavior
In the past years, hooliganism has become a big issue for Swiss football. Incidents such as the Disgrace of Basel in 2006 were becoming more common. The Zurich derby should not be immune to this phenomenon: In a match on 2 October 2011, the situation hit an all-time low. GC Fans had stolen a banner of FCZ fanclub "Boys" and later displayed the defaced flag during the match as provocation. As a result, FCZ fans snuck into the GC fan sector and threw flares at GC fans. In the 70th minute, at a score of 2–1 for Grasshoppers, referee Sasha Kever put a stop to the match when he saw rioting fans cross the barriers and enter the pitch. Dozens were arrested and 6 were injured in the riots. This day was known in Switzerland as "Die Schande von Zürich" (translated "The Disgrace or Zurich"). In the aftermath, Grasshopper were awarded a 3–0 victory.

And the current season, with a return of GC to the top Swiss flight, is no different: On 23 October 2021, after a 3–3 result, FCZ fans threw fireworks into the GC fan sector. Both teams were fined 20,000 Swiss francs, as GC were the home team and responsible for security. Furthermore, FCZ fan sectors are closed for their next two home games.

FCZ fans also disrupted a celebration by GC fans outside Letzigrund following GC's Challenge League victory and promotion, on 20 May 2021. Eleven people were arrested as a result.

Matches played since 1990

League

Cup

Statistics

Honours

References

Association football rivalries
Derby
Derby
Sport in Zürich